Jonathan Michael Petrie (born 19 October 1976) is a Scottish rugby union executive and former player. During his active career he played at flanker for Glasgow Warriors and Scotland.

Petrie had two seasons in Scotland's under-21 team, making his debut against the Irish in 1997 while he was playing in France with Colomiers. Petrie's Scotland A debut was in the 99–0 win over the Netherlands at Murrayfield in December 1999. He won his first cap in the second test on the tour of New Zealand in 2000, his first try for Scotland came in 31–8 November 2000 win against Samoa. He was given the captaincy by then Scotland coach Frank Hadden in 2005 leading Scotland to their first ever victory against the Barbarians.

Petrie was Club Captain of Glasgow Warriors from 2004 to 2006.

Jon Petrie was denied his first Test series as captain by injury ahead of the matches against Argentina, Samoa and New Zealand in November 2005.

His later career was blighted by injury and he was eventually replaced as captain by Jason White.

Jon Petrie announced his retirement as a player from Rugby Union in March 2007.

On 16 July 2015 it was announced that he would take over as managing director of Edinburgh Rugby.

Since January 2019 he is Chief Executive of Ulster Rugby.

Notes

1976 births
Living people
Scottish rugby union players
Rugby union players from Dundee
People educated at the High School of Dundee
Alumni of the University of St Andrews
University of St Andrews RFC players
Scotland international rugby union players
Dundee HSFP players
Glasgow Warriors players
Rugby union flankers
Ulster Rugby non-playing staff